Saint Martin, was the main station on the CF Caen-Mer and the terminus of the line for trains from Courseulles and Luc-sur-Mer.

The station and line opened on 30 June 1875, with a spur linking it to the CF de l'Ouest opened on 12 September 1877. The station closed in 1951, after a few years closure during 1945, after World War II and an extensive utilisation for the transport of military supplies.

Saint Martin station was situated on Caen's Place du Canada and the building is still present.

See also
Caen (Ouest/ETAT, SNCF)
Caen Saint-Pierre (CF du Calvados)

Defunct railway stations in Calvados
Railway stations in France opened in 1875
Railway stations closed in 1951